Swim Team is an Indian television series that aired on Channel V India from 9 March 2015 to 19 February 2016.

Cast 

 Pooja Banerjee as Rewa Mathur
 Ashmita Jaggi as Umang Tandon
 Shekhar Gill / Samridh Bawa as Bhagat Kapadia
 Lovekesh Solanki as Neil Chaudhary
 Ishaan Singh Manhas as Head Coach Jugnu Singh
 Amit Joshi as Jai Tandon
 Esha Chawla as Priyanka "Pixie" Khanna
 Priyamvada Kant as Kanika Jamwal
 Minaz Fruitwala as Deepam Yadav
 Amit Gaur as Coach Tarun Kapoor
 Pooja Bhamrah as Dr. Sana Ashraf
 Mallika Nayak as Ms. Mathur

References

External links 
 

Channel V India original programming
Indian television series
Indian teen drama television series
Indian television soap operas
Indian drama television series
2015 Indian television series debuts
2016 Indian television series endings
Indian sports television series